Suharna Surapranata (born December 13, 1955) is an Indonesian physicist and politician from Bandung, West Java. He is part of the Cabinet of Indonesia and has served as Minister of State for Research and Technology from April 2009, succeeding Kusmayanto Kadiman, until a reshuffle on October 18, 2011, replaced by Gusti Muhammad Hatta. He is a graduate of the Bandung Institute of Technology and the University of Indonesia.

He is co-founder of the Prosperous Justice Party and served as Chairman of the Central Advisory Council (MPP). He is also co-founder of the Scientists Society of Indonesia (MITI).

References 

Indonesian physicists
1955 births
Living people
People from Bandung
University of Indonesia alumni
Bandung Institute of Technology alumni
Government ministers of Indonesia
Prosperous Justice Party politicians